Rodochori is a village located in the Tsotyli municipality, situated in Kozani regional unit, in the Greek region of Macedonia. The village of Krimini is nearby.

Rodochori's elevation is 730 meters. The postal code is 50002, while the telephone code is +30 24680. At the 2011 census, the population was 52.

References

Populated places in Kozani (regional unit)